Dypsis pembana is a species of flowering plant in the family Arecaceae. It is found only in Tanzania.

References

pembana
Flora of Tanzania
Vulnerable plants
Taxonomy articles created by Polbot
Taxa named by Harold E. Moore